Phanfone may refer to four  tropical cyclones in the northwestern Pacific Ocean. It is a Lao term for Animal.

 Typhoon Phanfone (2002) (T0213, 19W) – affected Japan
 Severe Tropical Storm Phanfone (2008) (T0810) – churned in the open ocean.
 Typhoon Phanfone (2014) (T1418, 18W, Neneng) – made landfall in Japan
 Typhoon Phanfone (2019) (T1929, 30W, Ursula) – struck the Philippines resulting in at least 50 deaths and $67.2 million (2019 USD) in damages.

The name Phanfone was retired following the 2019 typhoon season and replaced with Nokaen, which means "swallow" in Laotian.

Pacific typhoon set index articles